Mutha can refer to:

Places
 Mutha River, a river in western India
 Mutha, Banmauk, a village in north-central Burma

Other uses
 Mother
 Short for Motherfucker

See also 

 Mula-Mutha River, formed by confluence of the Mula and Mutha Rivers